Highway beautification is landscaping and control of the usage of the land by highways.

In the United States, highway beautification is subject the Highway Beautification Act, Section 131 of Title 23, United States Code (1965), commonly referred to as "Title I of the Highway Beautification Act of 1965, as Amended". The act placed restriction on billboard advertising along highways and removal or screening of junkyards.

References

Road infrastructure
Highways